The Swiss Handball Association (SHV) is the governing body of handball and beach handball in Swiss Confederation. Founded in 1974, SHV is affiliated to the International Handball Federation and European Handball Federation. SHV is also affiliated to the Swiss Olympic Association. It is based in Olten.

SHV Competitions
 Swiss Handball League 
 Spar Premium League

National teams
 Switzerland men's national handball team
 Switzerland men's national junior handball team
 Switzerland men's national youth handball team
 Switzerland women's national handball team
 Switzerland women's national junior handball team
 Switzerland women's national youth handball team

Competitions Hosted

International
 1986 World Men's Handball Championship
 2001 Men's Junior World Handball Championship

Continental
 2006 European Men's Handball Championship

Affiliated Clubs
 Kadetten Schaffhausen
 LC Brühl Handball 
 LK Zug
 Pfadi Winterthur
 RTV 1879 Basel
 Spono Eagles
 TSV St. Otmar St. Gallen
 Wacker Thun

References

External links
 Official website 
 Swiss Handball Association at IHF site

Members
1974 establishments in Switzerland
Handball
Sports organizations established in 1974
Handball governing bodies